The Client List is an American television drama series based on the 2010 television film of the same name, which aired on the Lifetime network. The series stars Jennifer Love Hewitt, who starred in the film, though she plays a different character in a premise that is slightly different from the film. The series premiered on Sunday, April 8, 2012.

Lifetime ordered an initial 10 episodes for the first season and on May 7, 2012, renewed the series for a second season of 15 episodes to air March 10, 2013. On November 1, 2013, Lifetime cancelled the series after two seasons.

Premise
The series follows Riley Parks (Jennifer Love Hewitt), who, after her husband abandons her and their children, leaving her in financial debt, accepts work at a day spa in her small Texas town, but refuses when she learns that for some clients the masseuses provide more than massages. But pressed to support her children, she relents and earns extra money through unspecified erotic services. As she deals with her children, her mother, her friends, the girls at the spa, and various men who want to romance her, Riley tries to keep her work in an erotic limbo a secret.

Cast and characters

Main cast
 Jennifer Love Hewitt as Riley Parks (née Campbell), the main character whose husband leaves her during a financial crisis when they risk losing their house to foreclosure. Riley is hired at The Rub as a massage therapist and soon realizes the only way to make enough money to catch up financially is to give "extras" to some of the clients. Although hesitant at first, she soon accepts this as a way to save their house and provide for her family. She has a supportive brother-in-law, Evan, who is always looking after her children when she is out and is a close friend to her. Riley and Evan soon develop a relationship, which upsets Riley's husband, Kyle, when he returns later in the series. Riley's best friend Lacey tells her that Kyle planned on leaving her after Lacey finds out the truth about the job's extra services. 
 Cybill Shepherd as Lynette Montgomery, Riley's mother who works at a hair salon and has been married many times. She tries to look out for Riley's and her grandchildren's best interests.
 Loretta Devine as Georgia Cummings-Clemens, the former owner of the massage parlor, The Rub, in Sugar Land.
 Colin Egglesfield as Evan Parks,  Riley's brother-in-law, her husband Kyle's brother, who also harbors secret feelings for her.
 Rebecca Field as Lacey Jean Locklin, Riley's best friend since childhood who has discovered the truth about what Riley and most of the other massage therapists do and wants her to quit.
 Alicia Lagano as Selena Ramos, a masseuse at the parlor, who often offers "extra services" to her clients. Selena also recommended the masseuse job to Riley. She is shown to be jealous of Riley's relationship with Georgia, who gives her extra responsibilities at the shop, and later becomes her boss. She and Evan had a brief romance, but it did not last.
 Brian Hallisay as Kyle Parks (recurring role, season 1; main role, season 2), Riley's husband and Evan's brother, who ran away from his family. He is arrested for stealing copper wire and wants Riley back. She hires a defense attorney for him solely because he is the father of her children.
 Naturi Naughton as Kendra (season 1), a hard-working masseuse at the parlor. Kendra quit The Rub along with Jolene in the beginning of the second season.
 Kathleen York as Jolene (season 1), another masseuse working at the parlor, who does not give "extras".  She only gives "straight" massages. Jolene quit The Rub along with Kendra in the beginning of the second season.
 Laura-Leigh as Nikki Shannon (season 2), the newly hired masseuse at The Rub.

Recurring cast
 Tyler Champagne as Travis Parks, Kyle and Riley's son
 Cassidy Guetersloh as Katie Parks, Kyle and Riley's daughter
 Greg Grunberg as Dale Locklin, Lacey's husband
 Elisabeth Röhm as Taylor Berkhalter, a woman who continually competes with Riley and ends up buying the hair salon where Lynette and Lacey both work.
 Bart Johnson as Beau Berkhalter, Taylor's husband, who later cheated on her.
 Rob Mayes as Derek Malloy (season 2), a masseur working at the parlor, who has sexual relations with Selena.
 T.V. Carpio as Shelby Prince (season 2), a fellow police officer who met Evan at the police academy, later becoming his girlfriend.
 Michael Beach as Harold Clemens (season 2), Georgia's boyfriend and later husband. 
 Brian Howe as Judge Overton (season 2), one of the names on the client list, working on the inside with Riley.
 Marco Sanchez as Graham Sandoval (season 2), Kyle's attorney.
 Johnathon Schaech as Greg Carlyle (season 2), a strip club owner that Nikki used to work for, before becoming a masseuse.
 Tammy Townsend as Karina Lake (season 2)
 Sunny Mabrey as Lisa Munsey (season 2)
 Michelle Faraone as Michelle (season 2)
 McKinley Freeman as Client 1 (season 1)
 Desi Lydic as Dee Ann (season 1), a masseuse working at the parlor.
 Brian Kerwin as Garrett (season 1), Lynette's ex-boyfriend, whom Lynette almost considered marrying.
 Jon Prescott as Dr. Mark Flemming (season 1), a single-father widower who asked Riley on a date.

Production

Development
The show is based around Lifetime's 2010 television film of the same name, with Jennifer Love Hewitt reprising the lead role. The series, however, is a re-imagining of the film and is not a direct continuation of the film's storyline. The most notable change is that the husband of Hewitt's character abandons his family in the television series before she becomes involved in prostitution, whereas in the film he leaves with their children after the scandal is exposed.

The pilot was written by Jordan Budde, and the film's producers all executive-produced the series alongside Hewitt. Budde got the job because Suzanne Martin was busy working on Hot in Cleveland at the time. Upon being given the assignment Budde watched the original movie and felt that the story had ended and also that it was "super depressing" instead he decided to reimagine the show and pitched it that way to Lifetime who accepted.  At one point the network toyed with the idea of calling the show "The Rub" and have no connection to the original movie although they eventually decided against this.

Early on Hewitt was involved in the casting of her masseuse clients, although as the show went on she dialed back her involvement in this. This, in part, led to complaints that "the guys were all so good looking". Later the team tried to cast "more real guys" although by this point the network refused, insisting on "hot guys".

Three promotional materials were filmed in October 2011 and released before the series premiered. The first of these materials, released on January 26, 2012, featured Hewitt performing Shirley Bassey's "Big Spender" in a music video-style advert, in reference to the true nature of the work at the massage parlor. The video received much interest from the media due to Hewitt's risqué role, who noted that "based on this new promo, the show is going to be seriously hot."

Filming and premiere
Season 1 consists of 10 episodes. The series began filming on January 17, 2012. Filming of Season 1 ended on May 2, 2012. Season 1 premiered on April 8, 2012 and ended on June 17, 2012.

Filming for the second season began on November 1, 2012. Filming of Season 2 ended on April 18, 2013. Season 2 premiered on March 10, 2013 and ended on June 16, 2013.

Episodes

Series overview

Season 1 (2012)

Season 2 (2013) 
On May 7, 2012, Lifetime renewed the series for a second season of 15 episodes. Filming for the season began on November 1, 2012, and it premiered on March 10, 2013.

Controversy
The Client List was the subject of a nationwide campaign by licensed massage therapists to stop the show before it aired. The group, "Massage Therapists Against The Client List", asserts that:

The Client List is a series that perpetuates the misconception that Massage Therapy includes inappropriate sexual contact. Massage Therapists are trained healthcare professionals and in most states are licensed and regulated by state medical boards. They adhere to a code of ethics and in some cases are under higher ethical standards than other healthcare professionals – because of these very same misconceptions. Many therapists are now working in doctor's offices and hospitals and providing valuable therapeutic services. The Client List is a huge step backwards."

A&E responded to the controversy with the following press release:

We appreciate your feedback concerning the new Lifetime Television series entitled, The Client List. For many years, Lifetime television has explored the complexity of women's lives and their stories through fiction and non-fiction movies, series and programs. The Client List is a fictionalized story about the experiences of a single mother as she unexpectedly faces dire economic circumstances. The series also features a broad range of characters with alternative points of view who make different choices. The Client List is not intended to depict any specific spa or massage entity, nor in any way demean or disparage the therapeutic massage profession and its benefits and contributions to the health and wellness industry.

Renewal delay and show cancellation
An expected third season renewal for the series was put on hold after the announcement of Jennifer Love Hewitt's pregnancy in June 2013. Hewitt reportedly wanted/insisted the real father of her child, co-star and fiancé Brian Hallisay’s character, to be the father of a fictional baby to be born by her character in the third season, while the show's executives and writers wanted Colin Egglesfield's character to be the father. Lifetime was undecided, which led to a renewal delay that lasted into October 2013. Due to creative differences between Hewitt, Lifetime, Sony Pictures Television, and ITV Studios America, the show was officially canceled on November 1, 2013 after two seasons.

Ratings
The first season of The Client List, consisting of 10 episodes, was watched by an average of 2.51 million viewers per week. The second season, consisting of 15 episodes, was watched by an average of 2.05 million viewers.

Awards and nominations

References

External links

2010s American drama television series
2012 American television series debuts
2013 American television series endings
English-language television shows
Lifetime (TV network) original programming
Television series by ITV Studios
Television series by Sony Pictures Television
Television shows set in Texas
Prostitution in American television